This is a list of Swedish logistic regiments, battalions, corps and companies that have existed in the Swedish Army. They are listed in three ways, first by the actual units that have existed, then by the various names these units have had, and last by the various designations these units have had.

By unit 
Göta Logistic Regiment
Norrland Logistic Regiment
Scanian Logistic Regiment
Svea Logistic Regiment
Logistic Regiment
Västmanland Logistic Corps
Östgöta Logistic Corps

By name 
2nd Göta Logistic Corps
2nd Svea Logistic Corps
1st Göta Logistic Corps
1st Svea Logistic Corps
Göta Logistic Battalion
Göta Logistic Corps
Göta Logistic Regiment
Norrland Logistic Battalion
Norrlands Logistic Corps
Norrland Logistic Regiment
Scanian Logistic Corps
Scanian Logistic Regiment
Svea Logistic Battalion
Svea Logistic Corps
Svea Logistic Regiment
Trängbataljonen
Logistic Regiment
Västmanland Logistic Corps
Wendes Logistic Battalion
Wendes Logistic Corps
Östgöta Logistic Corps

By designation 
 T 1 - Svea Logistic Regiment
 T 2 - Göta Logistic Regiment
 T 3 - Norrland Logistic Regiment
 T 4 - Scanian Logistic Regiment
 T 5 - Västmanland Logistic Corps
 T 6 - Östgöta Logistic Corps
 TrängR - Logistic Regiment

See also 
Swedish Army Service Troops
List of Swedish regiments

References 
Print

Online

 
logistic